Events in the year 1896 in China.

Incumbents
 Guangxu Emperor (22nd year)

Events
 By 1896, China showed interest in Aksai Chin, reportedly a result of Russian instigation.
 February – Russo-Chinese Bank, opened a Shanghai branch.
 August 28 – China joined the Russo-Chinese Bank as a partner for the construction of China Eastern Railway. The bank was renamed to Sino-Russian Righteousness Victory Bank (Traditional Chinese: 華俄道勝銀行).
 Dungan Revolt (1895–96), a rebellion of various Chinese Muslim ethnic groups in Qinghai and Gansu against the Qing dynasty

References

 
Years of the 19th century in China